Florin Towne Centre, formerly Florin Mall and Florin Center, is an outdoor shopping center in the unincorporated area of Parkway-South Sacramento near Sacramento, California, United States. It opened in 2008 on the site of the old Florin Mall, which closed and was demolished in 2006. The  center is anchored by AutoZone, PetSmart and Walmart Supercenter.

History

Florin Mall 
Florin Mall (originally named Florin Center) was built by the James J. Cordano Company and Blumenfield Enterprises. It was the Sacramento area's first fully enclosed shopping mall built from the ground up. The site had previously been utilized as the Sky Ranch Airfield.

The mall was opened in February 1968 and was anchored by a 3-level, Sacramento-based Weinstock's, which held its grand opening October 9, 1967. The mall also included a 2-level,  Sears and a 2-level,  JCPenney. Other major stores surrounding the mall (but not part of the property) were Montgomery Ward (now Burlington), Zody's (later Pak 'n Save) and a White Front discount store (later Price Club).  On March 23, 1968 during the 1968 US presidential campaign, Senator Robert F Kennedy made a campaign stop at the recently opened Florin Mall.

The only physical expansion of the  shopping center was completed in 1978.

As the second mall-type center on Sacramento's south side, it eclipsed its nearest commercial competitor, Southgate Plaza.

By the 1980s, Florin Mall was becoming rather notorious as a haven for shootings, stabbings and car thefts. Local gangs had made the complex a regular hangout spot by the early 1990s. Customers began wafting to other frequent regional centers, such as Arden Fair, Downtown Plaza and Sunrise Mall. A remodeling of Weinstock's in 1989 and a facelift renovation of the mall proper in the second half of 1990 did little to dispel the negative image that the center had taken on, especially in 1991 when four perpetrators took 41 people hostage at a Good Guys! electronics store that was adjacent to the mall. It resulted in the deaths of three hostages, injuring 14 others and remains, to this day, the largest hostage rescue operation in U.S. history.

With the acquisition of Weinstock's by Federated Department Stores in August 1995, it was decided that the Florin Mall location be shuttered rather than converting it to Macy's. The store closed in March 1996. This was seen as the first significant decline to Florin Mall. JCPenney was converted to an outlet store in November 1998. The store was shuttered in 2003, leaving Sears as the sole anchor of the mall.

In a state of disrepair for some time, the bulk of Florin Mall was purchased by San Francisco's Jim Kessler and Prudential Insurance Company in October 2005. The mall closed on February 28, 2006. It was fully demolished in July 2006 (including the former JCPenney and Weinstock's anchors) leaving Sears, its Auto Center, and five outparcels standing.

Florin Towne Centre 
Construction of Florin Towne Centre commenced shortly after Florin Mall was demolished. On March 6, 2008, Mervyn's became the first store to open in the new shopping center, however the store was short-lived as it was shuttered in February 2009 when the entire chain went out of business. It sat vacant the majority of the time (aside from temporary usage for seasonal retailers such as Halloween City) until 2019 when AutoZone opened in a portion of the former Mervyn's. The other major opening in 2008 was fitness chain 24 Hour Fitness. Walmart opened on June 17, 2009, replacing a former store  to the west (the old store re-opened six years later as Walmart's Neighborhood Market format in 2015, occupying only half of the old store's original footprint, but later closed in 2019). PetSmart opened on November 12, 2011 in a building adjacent to the former Mervyn's that was originally intended for Old Navy, but never opened. Other retailers include Eyeglass World, GameStop, GNC,  Starbucks, and Verizon Wireless.

In 2015, Sears Holdings spun off 235 of its properties, including the Sears at the Florin Towne Centre, into Seritage Growth Properties.

On October 15, 2018, it was announced that Sears would be closing as part of a plan to close 142 stores nationwide. The store closed later that year. Sears was the only remnant and remaining anchor from the former Florin Mall that continued to operate until its closure.

In 2021, 24 Hour Fitness was shuttered.

Anchor stores

Current 

 AutoZone (opened 2019)
 CHEF'STORE (opened 2019 as Smart Foodservice Warehouse)
 PetSmart (opened 2011)
 Walmart Supercenter (opened 2009)

Former 

 24 Hour Fitness (opened 2008, closed 2021)
 Famsa (opened 2008, closed 2014)
 JCPenney / JCPenney Outlet Store (opened 1968, closed 2003)
 Mervyn's (opened 2008, closed 2009)
 Sears (opened 1968, closed 2018)
 Weinstock's (opened 1967, closed 1996)

Notes

References

External links
 http://florintownecentre.com/ (archive)

2008 establishments in California
Shopping malls established in 2008
Shopping malls in Sacramento County, California